Erianthus is a genus of grasshoppers restricted to Southeast Asia. They occur in Japan, northeast India, Myanmar, Thailand, Vietnam, South China including Hong Kong, and extend east to Sumatra. In the past some neotropical species were also included in the genus. They have narrow ranges and species are identifiable only by their characteristics of male and female genitalia.

The genus was erected in 1875 by Swedish entomologist Carl Stål in his Observations Orthopterologiques. Erianthus is the family Chorotypidae and is the largest genus in the subfamily Erianthinae by number of species. The type species is Mastax guttata (now Erianthus guttatus).

Species

, species in Erianthus include:
Erianthus angulatus Ingrisch & Willemse, 1988 – Thailand
Erianthus armatus Descamps, 1975 – Vietnam
Erianthus bolivari Descamps, 1975 – Indochina
Erianthus delattrei Descamps, 1975 – Cambodia
Erianthus dohrni Bolívar, 1914 – Vietnam
Erianthus fruhstorferi Bolívar, 1930 – Thailand
Erianthus guttatus (Westwood, 1841) – Malesia
Erianthus inhamatus Ingrisch & Willemse, 1988 – Thailand
Erianthus malcolmi Bolívar, 1903 – Malaysia
Erianthus manueli Ingrisch & Willemse, 1988 – Thailand
Erianthus nipponensis Rehn, 1904 – Japan
Erianthus pyramidalis Ingrisch & Willemse, 1988 – Thailand
Erianthus rehni Descamps, 1975 – Thailand
Erianthus serratus Ingrisch & Willemse, 1988 – Thailand
Erianthus sukhothaiensis Descamps, 1981 – Thailand
Erianthus versicolor Brunner von Wattenwyl, 1898 – Indochina
Erianthus vitalisi Bolívar, 1914 – Indochina

References 

Chorotypidae
Caelifera genera
Orthoptera of Asia
Insects of Southeast Asia